Badinières is a former commune in the Isère department in the Rhône-Alpes region of south-eastern France. In January 2015 it merged with Eclose, forming the new commune Eclose-Badinières.

The inhabitants of the commune are known as Badiniérois or Badiniéroises.

Geography
Badinières is located some 45 km south-east of Lyon and 10 km south of Bourgoin-Jallieu. Access to the commune is by the D1085 road from Bourgoin-Jallieu in the north which passes through the heart of the commune and the village before continuing south to Eclose. Apart from some forest along the eastern border the commune is entirely farmland.

The Agny river forms the north-western border of the commune as it flows north-east to join the Bourbre in Nivolas-Vermelle. The Ruisseau de Barthgolomat rises north of the village and flows north-west to join the Agny on the northern border of the commune.

Neighbouring communes and villages

History
The commune was created in 1857 from the commune of Les Éparres.

There were Agricultural Shows in 1991 and on 26–27 August 2006.

Administration

List of Successive Mayors

Demography
In 2012 the commune had 610 inhabitants.

Sites and monuments

A Church from the 19th century

References

External links
Badinières official website  
Badinières on the old National Geographic Institute website 
Badinières on Géoportail, National Geographic Institute (IGN) website 
Badiniere on the 1750 Cassini Map

Former communes of Isère
Dauphiné